Something to Believe In is the thirteenth studio album by Curtis Mayfield, released in 1980.

Track listing
All tracks composed by Curtis Mayfield, except where noted.

Personnel
Curtis Mayfield - vocals, guitar
Keni Burke, Joseph "Lucky" Scott - bass
Wendell Stewart - drums 
Ross Traut, Tom Ferrone - guitar
Arthur Hoyle, Bill Porter, Dale Clevenger, Gil Askey, Lenard Druss, Paul Howard, Robert Lustrea, Sonny Seals - horns
Rich Tufo, Tim Tobias - keyboards
Alejo, Tony Carpenter - percussion
Adrian Gola, Arnie Roth, Elizabeth Cifani, Frank Borgognone, Fred Spector, Harold D. Klatz, John Frigo, Karl Fruh, Leonard Chausow, Roger Moulton, Sol Bobrov, William Schoen - strings
Technical
Fred Breitberg, Roger Anfinsen - engineer
Ernie Barnes - cover painting

Samples used
"Tripping Out"
"Black Nostaljack AKA Come On" by Camp Lo from their 1997 album Uptown Saturday Night (album)
"Breaking Through" by Toshinobu Kubota from his 2004 album Time to Share

1980 albums
Curtis Mayfield albums
Albums produced by Gil Askey
Albums produced by Curtis Mayfield
Curtom Records albums